The Burr Oak United Methodist Church is a church at the northeast corner of Pennsylvania and Washington Streets in Burr Oak, Kansas. It was built in 1912 and added to the National Register of Historic Places in 2007.

It is a two-story, red brick and limestone structure with a hipped roof. It was deemed notable as "a late Victorian example of Richardson[ian] Romanesque architecture in a small Kansas town."

References

External links

Methodist churches in Kansas
Churches on the National Register of Historic Places in Kansas
Romanesque Revival church buildings in Kansas
Churches completed in 1912
Jewell County, Kansas
1912 establishments in Kansas
National Register of Historic Places in Jewell County, Kansas